This is a list of forts in New France built by the French government or French chartered companies in what later became Canada, Saint Pierre and Miquelon, and the United States.  They range from large European-type citadels like at Quebec City to tiny fur-trade posts.

Canada
The French forts in Canada were located from the Atlantic Ocean to as far west as the confluence of the North and South Saskatchewan rivers, and as far north as James Bay. Built between the 1640s and the 1750s, a few were captured from rival British fur trading companies like Hudson's Bay Company. The forts were located on waterways to provide transport of fur back east to Montreal or Quebec City. A few have survived or been re-built, but most are ruins or simply disappeared after abandonment.

Saint Pierre and Miquelon

United States
The French forts built in what is now the United States, were part of a series of forts built from the Great Lakes to the Mississippi delta; as far west as the Dakotas, as far east as Maine.

See also

 Military of New France
 List of Hudson's Bay Company trading posts
 List of North American cities by year of foundation
Canada related
 Canadian Forces base
 Former colonies and territories in Canada
 List of Royal Canadian Air Force stations
 List of Royal Canadian Navy stations
United States related
 List of United States Army installations
 List of United States Army airfields
 List of United States military bases
 List of United States Navy installations
 List of United States Marine Corps installations
 List of United States Air Force installations

References

French military-related lists
Lists of buildings and structures in Canada
Lists of buildings and structures in the United States
Lists of forts
Lists of place names
United States history-related lists